The following lists events that happened during 1948 in South Africa.

Incumbents
 Monarch: King George VI.
 Governor-General and High Commissioner for Southern Africa: Gideon Brand van Zyl.
 Prime Minister: Jan Christiaan Smuts (until 4 June), Daniel François Malan (starting 4 June).
 Chief Justice: Ernest Frederick Watermeyer.

Events

January
 4 – Prince Edward Island is annexed.

March
 13 – Dr. K. Goonam leads a batch of twelve passive resisters across the Natal-Transvaal border.

May
 26 – The National Party wins the General Elections in coalition with the Afrikaner Party (AP).
 28 – The National Party forms a new South African government as incumbent prime minister Jan Smuts loses his seat.

June
 4 – Daniel François Malan is elected the 4th Prime Minister of South Africa.
 12 – The first Rembrandt cigarettes are manufactured.

September
 8 – A group of 83 German children, orphaned by the war, arrives in Table Bay.
 10 – The German orphans reach Pretoria to settle in South Africa.

October
 15 – Foreign Minister Eric Louw informs Commonwealth leaders that South Africa is not prepared to allow interference in its domestic affairs.

Births
 27 January – Irvin Khoza, football administrator, chairman of Orlando Pirates F.C., president of the Premier Soccer League
 2 February – Mluleki George, politician.
 10 February – Paul Slabolepszy, actor and playwright.
 24 June – Dave Orchard, cricketer.
 9 July – Jeanne Zaidel-Rudolph, composer, pianist and teacher.
 18 July – Graham Spanier, 16th President of Pennsylvania State University
 27 July – Goodwill Zwelithini kaBhekuzulu, King of the Zulu.
 27 July – Gavin Watson, businessman (d. 2019).
 30 July – John Briscoe, South African-American epidemiologist, engineer, and academic (d. 2014)
 5 September – Pumza Dyantyi, politician and anti-apartheid activist (d. 2020)
 17 October – S'bu Ndebele, politician, government minister
 25 October – Lauritz Dippenaar, self made millionaire businessman, investor and banker who was the Chairman of FirstRand financial Group.
 10 December – Thamsanga Mnyele, artist and activist. (d. 1985)
 13 December
 Lillian Board, South African-born English Olympic athlete. (d. 1970)
 William Flynn, actor and comedian, (d. 2007)

Deaths
 2 February – Bevil Rudd, athlete. (b. 1894)
 25 February – Alexander du Toit, geologist. (b. 1878)
 3 December – Jan Hofmeyr, Prime Minister of South Africa. (b. 1894)

Railways

Railway lines opened
 7 June – Free State: Whites to Odendaalsrus, .

Sports
South Africa at the 1948 Summer Olympics
English cricket team in South Africa in 1948–49

References

History of South Africa
Years in South Africa
DROLE NON